"Wanna Do You Right" is a song by American R&B duo, K-Ci & JoJo. It was released in 2001 as the second single from their third studio album, X.

Chart positions

References 

2000 songs
2001 singles
K-Ci & JoJo songs
MCA Records singles
Songs written by Homer Banks
Songs written by Raymond Jackson (songwriter)
Songs written by Teddy Riley
Songs written by Roy "Royalty" Hamilton
Songs written by Carl Hampton